Miodrag "Grof" Božović (born 22 June 1968) is a Montenegrin football manager and former player.

Playing career

Club
A tall central defender, Božović played alongside Yugoslav and Montenegrin legends Predrag Mijatović and Dejan Savićević at Budućnost Titograd and for fellow Yugoslav team Red Star Belgrade, whom he left in 1994 during the civil war to play in Indonesia. He also played for Dutch clubs RKC Waalwijk and RBC Roosendaal, as well as in Cyprus and Japan.

During his playing career Božović won Yugoslav Cup with Red Star Belgrade.

International
He represented his U-21 national side once.

Managerial career
As a coach, he had a successful spell in Budućnost in the 2006–07 season, when his team was leading in Montenegrin First League, but he resigned and joined Grbalj in February 2007, due to the disagreement with the board. Božović also was successful in Borac Čačak, as he made a competitive team out of a humble club.

Russian side FC Amkar Perm qualified for the UEFA Europa League for the first time in club's history under his management. Next season, his new club FC Moscow was among the leaders in the Russian Premier League for long stretches, before fading in the end of the season and falling out of European qualification. In early 2010, FC Moscow dropped out of the Premier League due to financial considerations, and Božović became a free agent.

On 27 April 2010, Božović signed a three-year contract with FC Dynamo Moscow.

After the game against his former club, Amkar, he was questioned in the flash interview, did he feel that he was playing against the team he had built himself. His answer was: "I feel I was playing against players who made me a coach."

He resigned from Dynamo on 21 April 2011 after losing in a Russian Cup quarterfinal against FC Rostov (winning the Cup was the last hope for Dynamo to qualify for UEFA Europa League).

In Serbia Božović was nicknamed Grof (the Count or Earl), because of his orderly and elegant appearance.

In June 2012 he became the manager of FC Rostov. The next season Rostov won the 2013–14 Russian Cup.

Red Star

2015-16
On 29 May 2015 it was announced that Božović would manage his former club Red Star Belgrade. His start as Red Star manager was turbulent. Red Star was eliminated by Kairat in the first qualifying round for the Europa League and started off the regular season with a comeback win against OFK Beograd and a draw against Metalac in Gornji Milanovac in the first two rounds of the Serbian Superliga. Serbian media and journalist were not on his side and criticized him and his team's play. After a draw against Radnički Niš in front of 22.000 fans who started to chant against the club board, Božović offered his resignation. Fans were explicit in their desire that board members must leave the club right away, not him, and gave clear support to Božović. Several board members including the vice president and the general director left the club and Božović started a "little war" with the media. After the series of bad performances, Red Star dominated throughout the match and won after a comeback against Čukarički, considered the best match of the season.

Following these incidents, Božović masterminded Red Star to 24 straight wins in the regular season, a new club record, and dominated the Serbian Superliga with 32 points ahead of their rivals. With Božović at the helm Red Star made the best start in club history. Božović lead Red Star to the 27th club league title in history, and the first in his career. Božović stated that he is very happy like never before in his life.

2016-17
After clear and unambiguous support from Red Star fans, who were chanted his name and ask to stay, Grof Božović signed new two-year contract with Red Star to lead the club to the Champions League. Božović said that chants from the fans and whole stands of Marakana are the biggest thing which happened to him in his life, after birth of his sons. He record his first European victory, which is also Red Star first in three years and five matches in a row, against Valletta FC in first match of second qualifying round for the Champions League in Valletta.

Return to Russia
He signed with the Russian Premier League club FC Arsenal Tula before the 2017–18 season. He led the club to the 7th place in the 2017–18 Russian Premier League, the best position in club's history. He did not renew his Arsenal contract at the end of the season.

On 5 October 2018, he signed a 2-year contract with FC Krylia Sovetov Samara. He left Krylia Sovetov by mutual consent on 28 June 2020, with the team in the last position in the table.

On 3 September 2021, he returned to Arsenal Tula. Arsenal was relegated at the end of the 2021–22 Russian Premier League after taking last place.

Other information
Speaks several languages.
The players who worked under him repeatedly noted his use of sex jokes in the training process.

Managerial statistics

Club statistics

Honours

Player
Red Star Belgrade
FR Yugoslavia Cup: 1992–93

Manager
Rostov
Russian Cup: 2013–14
Red Star Belgrade
Serbian SuperLiga: 2015–16

References

External links

Miodrag Bozovic: Why Europe Should Be Out for the Count

1968 births
Living people
People from Mojkovac
Association football defenders
Yugoslav footballers
Montenegrin footballers
Yugoslavia under-21 international footballers
Serbia and Montenegro footballers
FK Budućnost Podgorica players
Red Star Belgrade footballers
Pelita Bandung Raya players
APOP Kinyras FC players
RKC Waalwijk players
Avispa Fukuoka players
RBC Roosendaal players
Yugoslav First League players
First League of Serbia and Montenegro players
Liga 1 (Indonesia) players
Cypriot First Division players
Eredivisie players
J1 League players
Eerste Divisie players
Serbia and Montenegro expatriate footballers
Expatriate footballers in Indonesia
Serbia and Montenegro expatriate sportspeople in Indonesia
Expatriate footballers in Cyprus
Serbia and Montenegro expatriate sportspeople in Cyprus
Expatriate footballers in the Netherlands
Serbia and Montenegro expatriate sportspeople in the Netherlands
Expatriate footballers in Japan
Serbia and Montenegro expatriate sportspeople in Japan
Serbia and Montenegro football managers
Montenegrin football managers
FK Borac Čačak managers
FK Obilić managers
AEP Paphos FC managers
FK Budućnost Podgorica managers
OFK Grbalj managers
FC Amkar Perm managers
FC Moscow managers
FC Dynamo Moscow managers
FC Rostov managers
FC Lokomotiv Moscow managers
Red Star Belgrade managers
FC Arsenal Tula managers
PFC Krylia Sovetov Samara managers
Russian Premier League managers
Serbia and Montenegro expatriate football managers
Montenegrin expatriate football managers
Expatriate football managers in Cyprus
Expatriate football managers in Serbia
Montenegrin expatriate sportspeople in Serbia
Expatriate football managers in Russia
Montenegrin expatriate sportspeople in Russia